The Medallion Shield is an annual rugby union competition involving schools affiliated to the Ulster Branch of the Irish Rugby Football Union. The competition is open to all schools within Ulster, but only schools from within Northern Ireland currently enter, with no entries from schools situated in the three Ulster counties within the Republic of Ireland.

The competition has been contested continuously since its inception in 1910 and, in that time, fourteen different schools have secured at least a shared win of the shield. Teams entering the Medallion Shield are composed of boys who are under 15 years of age at the start of the school year. Entry in 2012-13 stood at 38 schools.

Campbell College, Belfast, has won 5 outright, most recently being the 2022 season. 
 
The 2023 competition resulted in a final between Ballymena Academy and Royal Belfast Academical Institution with RBAI winning 10-7.RBAI have now won the competition 35 times outright and shared it 3 times.

Foundation and growth

It was reported in 1909 that discussions had taken place between Belfast Royal Academy, Campbell College, Methodist College and Royal Belfast Academical Institution about setting up a rugby junior competition for pupils with an age qualification given as under fifteen years of age on 1 November. The success of the Leinster Schools Junior Cup which had started that year had prompted these discussions. Henry McIntosh, the Headmaster of Methodist College and respected rugby coach, was the main driving force behind the idea.

In 1910 Methodist College and Royal Belfast Academical Institution proceeded with the competition and for the first five years only these two schools competed. The third school to join was Royal School Dungannon in 1915. Bangor Grammar School entered for the first time in 1916, with Ballymena Academy and Coleraine Academical Institution following in 1917.

In 1977 the organising committee of Belfast Royal Academy, Methodist College Belfast, Royal Belfast Academical Institution and Royal School Dungannon ceded control of the competition to the Ulster Branch of the Irish Rugby Football Union.

Trophy

Initially without a trophy, a medal was presented to the winning captain at the conclusion of the second final in 1911. The original Medallion Shield was presented by the Governors of Methodist College with the medal mounted on the shield. When the original shield was filled with the names of winners, the Governors also provided a replacement shield. The original shield is on exhibit and can be viewed at the Methodist College Heritage Centre.

Venue of finals

All finals since 1973 had been played at Ravenhill. In 2014 the final was staged at the Queen's University Arena because of the ongoing development work at Ravenhill. Prior to 1973, the most commonly used venues were the North of Ireland grounds on the Ormeau Road in Belfast and the former Royal Belfast Academical Institution grounds at Orangefield, Belfast.

Future international players

Over the years a selection of players who went on to win international caps appeared in the Medallion Shield final. One future international appeared in the first ever final in 1910 with James B O'Neill a member of the victorious Methodist College team. He would win one cap for Ireland in 1920.

Further examples of future international players include:

 Arthur Coates Douglas played for Royal Belfast Academical Institution in the 1917 final, won 5 caps for Ireland.
 Dick Milliken captained the Bangor Grammar School team to victory in 1966 appeared 14 times for Ireland and 4 British & Irish Lion appearances.
 Niall Malone played for Methodist College Belfast in the 1986 final, won 3 caps for Ireland.
 Jonny Bell played for Coleraine Academical Institution in the 1989 final, won 36 caps for Ireland.
 David Irwin played for Royal Belfast Academical Institution in the 1974 final, and was capped 25 times for Ireland and toured with the British Lions in 1983.

Format

Until 2004 the Medallion Shield was competed for through an open draw, and since then a seeding system has been employed to determine the point at which a school enters the competition.

A Medallion Plate competition for first round losers was introduced in 1986.

The competition took on a new format in 2005 with further minor changes made since. Each team is assigned to a seeding group which determines the stage at which that team joins the competition. Each stage is run on a single tie knock-out basis, with replays for drawn games when necessary.

The structure since the 2009–10 season is as follows:

Stage 1. Weakest twelve teams enter for round 1. If necessary, a preliminary round will be played to establish these twelve teams. The six winners progress to round 2. The losers enter the Medallion Trophy together with the losers of the round 2 fixtures. The matches are determined by an open draw.
Stage 2. A further ten teams enter together with the six winners from round 1. The matches in round 2 are determined by an open draw. The eight winners progress to round 3. The eight losers join the six losers from round 1 and any preliminary round losers and compete for the Medallion Trophy.
Stage 3. A further eight teams enter together with the eight winners from round 2. The matches in round 3 are determined by an open draw. The eight winners progress to round 4. The eight losers contest for the Medallion Bowl.
Stage 4. The top eight seeded teams join the remaining eight winners from round 3. The matches in round 4 are determined by an open draw. The winners proceed to the quarter finals, semi finals and final. The eight losers in round 4 play for the Medallion Plate.

In 2014-15 the top eight seeded teams were Ballymena Academy, Ballyclare High School, Campbell College, Dalriada School, Methodist College Belfast, Royal Belfast Academical Institution, Sullivan Upper School and Wallace High School.

2014-15 season

The 2015 Medallion Shield final was won by  beating Wallace High School. Ballymena Academy defeated Down High School in the Plate final. Coleraine Academical Institution won against Grosvenor Grammar School in the Bowl final. Omagh Academy beat Strabane Academy in the Trophy final.

Performance by school
(Table incomplete; two finalists missing - 1934, 1937)

† denotes a shared win
‡ Annadale Grammar School became Wellington College in a merger in 1990.

Finals

1910s

1920s

1930s

1940s

1950s

1960s

1970s

1980s

1990s

2000s

2010s

2020s

Medallion Plate

1980s

1986 Ballymena Academy 15-0 Rainey Endowed School
1987 Larne Grammar School 10-8 Coleraine Academical Institution
1988 (???? v Belfast High School)
1989 Royal School Dungannon 21-0 Sullivan Upper School

1990s

1990 Campbell College 15-6 Coleraine Boys' Secondary School
1991 Wallace High School 14-0 Antrim Grammar School
1992 Ballyclare High School 7-6 Royal School Dungannon
1993 Bangor Grammar School 13-8 Antrim Grammar School
1994 Omagh Academy 10-5 Portadown College
1995 Ballymena Academy 22-6 Foyle and Londonderry College
1996
1997 Ballyclare High School 20-15 Foyle and Londonderry College
1998 Royal Belfast Academical Institution 30-7 Larne Grammar School
1999 Ballyclare High School 19-12 Larne Grammar School

2000s

2000 Rainey Endowed School 13-6 Grosvenor Grammar School
2001 Royal Belfast Academical Institution 22-7 Dalriada School
2002 Campbell College 17-12 Portadown College
2003 Ballyclare High School 20-17 Portora Royal School
2004 Wallace High School 27-22 Coleraine Academical Institution
2005 Campbell College 17-10 The Royal School, Armagh
2006 Royal Belfast Academical Institution 28-5 Sullivan Upper School
2007 The Royal School, Armagh 10-5 Ballymena Academy
2008 Belfast Royal Academy 22-0 Foyle and Londonderry College
2009 Wallace High School 37-22 Sullivan Upper School

2010s

 2010 Dromore High School 12-12 Limavady Grammar School Trophy shared
 2011 Methodist College Belfast 26-10 Ballymena Academy
 2012 Ballymena Academy 34-10 Dalriada School
 2013 Methodist College Belfast 63-3 Down High School
 2014 Coleraine Academical Institution 24-21 Banbridge Academy
 2015 Ballymena Academy 17-5 Down High School
 2016 Sullivan Upper School 12-10 Campbell College
 2017 Belfast Royal Academy 0-17 Sullivan Upper School
 2018 The Royal School, Armagh 25 - 0 Sullivan Upper School
 2019 Grosvenor Grammar School 8 - 7 Rainey Endowed School
 2022 Sullivan Upper School 22-12 Rainey Endowed School

Medallion Bowl

2005 Limavady Grammar 20 - 7 Foyle College
2006 Omagh Academy 13-0 Rainey Endowed School
2007 Omagh Academy 5-0 Bangor Grammar School
2008 Banbridge Academy 17-8 Belfast High School
2009 Dalriada School 19-17 Grosvenor Grammar School

2010s

 2010 Ballymena Academy 3-0 Sullivan Upper School
 2011 Rainey Endowed School 27-7 Grosvenor Grammar School
 2012 Carrickfergus Grammar School 14-7 Rainey Endowed School
 2013 Grosvenor Grammar School 17-10 Carrickfergus Grammar School
 2014 Bangor Grammar School 37-7 Belfast High School
 2015 Coleraine Academical Institution 7-3 Grosvenor Grammar School
 2016 Dalriada School 13-10 Bangor Grammar School 
 2017 Enniskillen Royal Grammar School 31-3 Down High School
 2018
 2019 Omagh Academy 17-11 Down High School
 2022 Banbridge Academy 19-10 Limavady Grammar School

Medallion Trophy

2005 Portora Royal School 13-8 Belfast High School
2006 Craigavon Senior High School 13-8 Friends School Lisburn
2007 Lisneal College 22-17 Downshire School
2008 Larne Grammar School 13-12 Downshire School
2009 Limavady Grammar School 28-3 Downshire School

2010s

 2010 Foyle and Londonderry College 38-7 Dalriada School
 2011 Dalriada School 12-0 Foyle and Londonderry College
 2012 Wellington College Belfast 17-8 Grosvenor Grammar School
 2013 Lurgan College 8-0 Dalriada School
 2014 Larne Grammar School 3-3 Rainey Endowed School shared
 2015 Omagh Academy 22-0 Strabane Academy
 2016 Foyle and Londonderry College 16-12 Cambridge House 
 2017 Ballyclare Secondary School 12-10 Grosvenor Grammar School

Sources

External links
 Ulster rugby

High school rugby union competitions in Ireland
Rugby union competitions in Ulster